The Incan hocicudo (Oxymycterus inca) is a species of rodent in the family Cricetidae.
It is found in Bolivia and Peru.

References

Musser, G. G. and M. D. Carleton. 2005. Superfamily Muroidea. pp. 894–1531 in Mammal Species of the World a Taxonomic and Geographic Reference. D. E. Wilson and D. M. Reeder eds. Johns Hopkins University Press, Baltimore.

Oxymycterus
Mammals described in 1900
Taxa named by Oldfield Thomas
Taxonomy articles created by Polbot